Louise Dahl-Wolfe (November 19, 1895 – December 11, 1989) was an American photographer. She is known primarily for her work for Harper's Bazaar, in association with fashion editor Diana Vreeland.

Background
Louise Emma Augusta Dahl was born November 19, 1895 in San Francisco, California to Norwegian immigrant parents; she was the youngest of three daughters. In 1914, she began her studies at the California School of Fine Arts (now the San Francisco Institute of Art), where she studied design and color with Rudolph Schaeffer, and painting with Frank Van Sloan. She took life drawing, anatomy, figure composition courses and other subjects over the next six years. After graduating, Dahl-Wolfe worked in designing electric signs and interiors. In 1921, Dahl-Wolfe met with photographer Anne Brigman, who inspired her to take up photography. Her first dark-room enlarger was a makeshift one she built herself, which used a tin can, an apple crate, and a part of a Ghirardelli chocolate box for a reflector. She studied design, decoration and architecture at Columbia University, New York in 1923. From 1927 to 1928, Dahl-Wolfe traveled with photographer Consuelo Kanaga, who furthered her interest in photography. Her first published photograph, titled Tennessee Mountain Woman, was published in Vanity Fair (U.S. magazine 1913–36). In 1928 she married the American sculptor Meyer Wolfe, who constructed the backgrounds of many of her photos.

Career
Dahl-Wolfe was known for taking photographs outdoors, with natural light in distant locations from South America to Africa in what became known as "environmental" fashion photography. Compared to other photographers at the time who were using red undertones, Dahl-Wolfe opted for cooler hues and also corrected her own proofs, with one example of her pulling proofs repeatedly to change a sofa's color from green to a dark magenta.

She preferred portraiture to fashion photography. Notable portraits include: Mae West, Vivien Leigh, Cecil Beaton, Eudora Welty, W. H. Auden, Christopher Isherwood, Orson Welles, Carson McCullers, Edward Hopper, Colette and Josephine Baker. She is known for her role in the discovery of a teenage Lauren Bacall whom she photographed for the March 1943 cover of Harper's Bazaar. One of her favourite subjects was the model Mary Jane Russell, who is estimated to have appeared in about thirty percent of Dahl-Wolfe's photographs. She was a great influence on photographers Irving Penn and Richard Avedon. One of her assistants was fashion and celebrity photographer, Milton H. Greene.

From 1933 to 1960, Dahl-Wolfe operated a New York City photographic studio that was home to the freelance advertising and fashion work she made for stores including Bonwit Teller and Saks Fifth Avenue. From 1936 to 1958 Dahl-Wolfe was a staff fashion photographer at Harper’s Bazaar. She produced portrait and fashion photographs totaling 86 covers, 600 color pages and countless black-and-white shots. She worked with editor Carmel Snow, art director Alexey Brodovitch and fashion editor Diana Vreeland, and traveled widely.  In 1950, she was selected for "America's Outstanding Woman Photographers" in the September issue of Foto. From 1958 until her retirement in 1960, Dahl-Wolfe worked as a freelance photographer for Vogue, Sports Illustrated, and other periodicals.

Dalhl-Wolfe lived many of her later years in Nashville, Tennessee.  She died in New Jersey of pneumonia in 1989. The full archive of Dahl-Wolfe's work is located at the Center for Creative Photography (CCP) at the University of Arizona in Tucson, which also manages the copyright of her work.

In 1999, her work was the subject of a documentary film entitled Louise Dahl-Wolfe: Painting with Light.  The film featured the only surviving modern footage of Dahl-Wolfe, including extensive interviews. It was written and directed by Tom Neff, edited by Barry Rubinow and produced by Neff and Madeline Bell.

Style 
Among the celebrated fashion photographers of the 20th century, Louise Dahl-Wolfe was an innovator and influencer who significantly contributed to the fashion world. She was most widely known for her work with Harper’s Bazaar. Dahl-Wolfe was considered a pioneer of the 'female gaze' in the fashion industry. Dahl-Wolfe created the new image of American women during the world war II. They were strong and independent. Dahl-Wolfe often shot on location and outdoors, bringing her models out of the studio and to exotic locales such as Tunisia, Cuba and South America. Her models pose candidly, almost as if Dahl-Wolfe had just walked in on them. Dahl-Wolf innovatively used color in photography and mainly concerned with the qualities of natural lighting, composition, and balance. Her methodology in using natural sunlight and shooting outdoors became the industry standard even now.

World War II
When the Nazi occupation of Paris began on 14 June 1940, the Fashion Group in the city of New York promoted and protected the business of fashion, called a meeting to discuss the impact would have on American commerce. Having just recovered from the economic devastation of the Great Depression, the fashion manufactures being cut off from French designs. Some were hesitant to continue without the guideline of Europe, but many were decided to survive through the war by promoting a unique “American Look.” Louise Dahl-Wolfe was characterized by the "American Look," which set a beauty standard and trend in fashion. 

“She is the most important woman, fashion photographer of the first half of the 20th century,” according to photographic expert Terrence Pepper and for Valerie Steele, the vitality and dynamism in Dahl-Wolfe’s work “were a big part of the rise of the American look.”

In 1943, President Franklin Roosevelt proclaimed the whole month of March as “Red Cross Month,” and the campaign raised $125 million war fund. This campaign demanded the most substantial amount of money in American history. Alongside with the tough circumstance, contemporary American women and professionals in the fashion industry, joined together to form a new style.

Selected works

Harper’s Bazaar cover, March 1943
Dahl-Wolfe dedicated to promoting patriotism in fashion in the World War II era. Her photography highlights the implications of World War II in the American fashion industry. The Harper’s Bazaar cover, March 1943, was one of the iconic photographs from Louise Dahl-Wolfe. The cover shows a young lady in front of the reception of American Red Cross Blood Donation clinic. She is styling chicly in an elegant navy suit, white blouse, black gloves, a cloche hat with long waves in her hair and holding a red bag with matching lipstick. The young woman looks either waiting to go inside to donate or about to leave the Red Cross blood donor room. The expression on her face is nonchalant with a suggestion that she does not attend the blood donation clinic regularly. Her eyes are empty. She may be disappointed or sad or helpless just as any other American woman knowing the reality is no one can escape. The audience can sense the uncertainty in the air of the time from her expression.

At the height of World War II, women had been left at home after their male counterparts were sent abroad to fight. The woman in the cover represented all American women who determined to do their part to contribute to the war. American women in World War II were no longer the delicate creature surrounded by flowers as seen in previous covers, but responsible individuals with the ability to do their bit of help. Harper’s Bazaar cover from March 1943, on the other hand, shows the power that women have gained in society. The cover is a mirror up to its audience, a reflection of the women, who had entered the workforce for the first time, who became wartime brides when they married their soldier, who take care family and just an occasional letter from a loved one to lament over. The model in the cover was 18-year-old Lauren Bacall, who was a successful actress in Hollywood. According to David Thomson, it was Diana Vreeland, who worked for both Harper’s Bazaar and Vogue, who discovered Lauren Bacall and placed her on the cover of Harper’s Bazaar.

References

Further reading
 Eauclaire, Sally. "Louise Dahl-Wolfe: A Retrospective Exhibition" (National Museum of Women in the Arts; 1987)
 Goldberg, Vicki; Richardson, Nan. Louise Dahl-Wolfe: A Retrospective (Harry N. Abrams; 2000)
 Martin, Leslie A. (ed.) Louise Dahl-Wolfe (Abrams. 2000)

External links
 Museum of Contemporary Photography Collection
 Louise Dahl-Wolfe Profile at the National Museum of Women in the Arts
 Louise Dahl-Wolfe: Painting with Light at the DOC: The Documentary Channel
 Louise Dahl-Wolfe FindingAid at the Center for Creative Photography
 Louise Dahl-Wolfe Images Online Center for Creative Photography (CCP) CCP at the University of Arizona has released a digital catalog of all Dahl-Wolfe's images.

Fashion photographers
American portrait photographers
1895 births
1989 deaths
American people of Norwegian descent
Artists from San Francisco
Photographers from California
Deaths from pneumonia in New Jersey
20th-century American photographers
20th-century American women photographers